Ribonuclease IV (endoribonuclease IV, poly(A)-specific ribonuclease) is an enzyme. This enzyme catalyses the following chemical reaction

 Endonucleolytic cleavage of poly(A) to fragments terminated by 3'-hydroxy and 5'-phosphate groups

This enzyme forms oligonucleotides with an average chain length of 10.

References

External links 

EC 3.1.26